Sessoms is a family name. Notable people with the surname include:
 Allen Sessoms (born 1946), American physicist, diplomat, and academic administrator
 Petey Sessoms (born 1972), American basketball player
 Will Sessoms (born ), American politician and bank officer